Enrique Gómez may refer to:
 Enrique Gómez (director) (1916–1955), Spanish screenwriter and film director
 Enrique Gómez (footballer) (born 2004), Mexican footballer
 Enrique Gómez Carrillo (1873–1927), Guatemalan literary critic, writer, journalist and diplomat
 Enrique Gómez Correa (1915–1995,), Chilean poet, lawyer and diplomat
 Kike Hermoso (Enrique Gómez Hermoso, born 1999), Spanish footballer